In mathematics, the Thom space, Thom complex, or Pontryagin–Thom construction (named after René Thom and Lev Pontryagin) of algebraic topology and differential topology is a topological space associated to a vector bundle, over any paracompact space.

Construction of the Thom space

One way to construct this space is as follows. Let

be a rank n real vector bundle over the paracompact space B. Then for each point b in  B, the fiber  is an -dimensional real vector space. Choose an orthogonal structure on E, a smoothly varying inner product on the fibers; we can do this using partitions of unity. If B is compact, then  is the one-point compactification of E.

The Thom isomorphism

The significance of this construction begins with the following result, which belongs to the subject of cohomology of fiber bundles. (We have stated the result in terms of  coefficients to avoid complications arising from orientability; see also Orientation of a vector bundle#Thom space.)

Let  be a real vector bundle of rank n. Then there is an isomorphism, now called a Thom isomorphism

for all k greater than or equal to 0, where the right hand side is reduced cohomology.

This theorem was formulated and proved by René Thom in his famous 1952 thesis.

This can be more easily seen in the formulation of the theorem that does not make reference to Thom space:

In concise terms, the last part of the theorem says that u freely generates  as a right -module. The class u is usually called the Thom class of E. Since the pullback  is a ring isomorphism,  is given by the equation:

Note: for this formula to make sense, u is treated as an element of (we drop the ring )

Significance of Thom's work

In his 1952 paper, Thom showed that the Thom class, the Stiefel–Whitney classes, and the Steenrod operations were all related. He used these ideas to prove in the 1954 paper Quelques propriétés globales des variétés differentiables that the cobordism groups could be computed as the homotopy groups of certain Thom spaces MG(n). The proof depends on and is intimately related to the transversality properties of smooth manifolds—see Thom transversality theorem. By reversing this construction, John Milnor and Sergei Novikov (among many others) were able to answer questions about the existence and uniqueness of high-dimensional manifolds: this is now known as surgery theory. In addition, the spaces MG(n) fit together to form spectra MG now known as Thom spectra, and the cobordism groups are in fact stable. Thom's construction thus also unifies differential topology and stable homotopy theory, and is in particular integral to our knowledge of the stable homotopy groups of spheres.

If the Steenrod operations are available, we can use them and the isomorphism of the theorem to construct the Stiefel–Whitney classes. Recall that the Steenrod operations (mod 2) are natural transformations

defined for all nonnegative integers m. If , then  coincides with the cup square. We can define the ith Stiefel–Whitney class  of the vector bundle  by:

Consequences for differentiable manifolds

If we take the bundle in the above to be the tangent bundle of a smooth manifold, the conclusion of the above is called the Wu formula, and has the following strong consequence: since the Steenrod operations are invariant under homotopy equivalence, we conclude that the Stiefel–Whitney classes of a manifold are as well. This is an extraordinary result that does not generalize to other characteristic classes. There exists a similar famous and difficult result establishing topological invariance for rational Pontryagin classes, due to Sergei Novikov.

Thom spectrum

Real cobordism 
There are two ways to think about bordism: one as considering two -manifolds  are cobordant if there is an -manifold with boundary  such that

Another technique to encode this kind of information is to take an embedding  and considering the normal bundle

The embedded manifold together with the isomorphism class of the normal bundle actually encodes the same information as the cobordism class . Showing the isomorphism of

requires a little more work.

Definition of Thom spectrum 
By definition, the Thom spectrum is a sequence of Thom spaces

where we wrote  for the universal vector bundle of rank n. The sequence forms a spectrum. A theorem of Thom says that  is the unoriented cobordism ring; the proof of this theorem relies crucially on Thom’s transversality theorem. The lack of transversality prevents from computing cobordism rings of, say, topological manifolds from Thom spectra.

See also
 Cobordism
 Cohomology operation
 Steenrod problem
 Hattori–Stong theorem

Notes

References
 
  A classic reference for differential topology, treating the link to Poincaré duality and the Euler class of Sphere bundles

External links
http://ncatlab.org/nlab/show/Thom+spectrum
 
 Akhil Mathew's blog posts: https://amathew.wordpress.com/tag/thom-space/

Algebraic topology
Characteristic classes